PS Ocean was a paddle steamer built for and  operated by the St. George Steam Packet Company from 1836, then the Cork Steamship Company and then the Chester and Holyhead Railway from 1853 to 1859 and the London and North Western Railway from 1859 to 1862.

History

She was built in Liverpool by Mottishead and Hayes for the St. George Steam Packet Company in 1836.

On 30 September 1854, Ocean ran aground off Ringsend, County Dublin.

When acquired by the London and North Western Railway in 1859 she was something of a stop-gap until new ships could be built.

She was scrapped in 1862.

References

1836 ships
Steamships
Ships built on the River Mersey
Ships of the London and North Western Railway
Paddle steamers of the United Kingdom
Maritime incidents in September 1854